The name of Cambodia in Khmer is  (UNGEGN: ,), officially  (UNGEGN: ,). This term derives from Sanskrit , which means the "land of Kambuja".

History 
The same name (i.e. Kamboj/Kambuja) is also found in Burmese and Thai chronicles referring to regions within those kingdoms. An origin-myth recorded in the Baksei Chamkrong inscription, dated AD 947, derives Kambuja from Svayambhuva Kamboj, a legendary Indian sage under whose gotra later, the merchant Kaundinya I reached the Indochinese peninsula and married a Nāga princess named Soma, thus uniting the Indian and local Southeast Asian Funanese cultures. In this story Kambuja derives from Kambu+ja, and means "descendants of Kambu."

Preăh Réachéanachâkr Kâmpŭchéa means "Kingdom of Cambodia". Etymologically, its components are: preăh ("sacred"); réach- ("king, royal, realm", from Sanskrit); -éana- (from Pāli , "authority, command, power"); -châkr (from Sanskrit chakra, meaning "wheel", a symbol of power and rule).

Official names of Cambodia since independence

See also
 Kambojas
 Chenla
 Greater India

References

History of Cambodia
Cambodia
Cambodia
Cambodia